Sound FM is an on-air brand used by a number of radio stations:

 CKMS-FM (formerly branded as 100.3 Sound FM), Waterloo, Ontario, Canada
 KKLQ (FM) (formerly branded as 100.3 The Sound), Los Angeles, California, United States